3OH!3  is the debut studio album by American electronic music band 3OH!3. The tracks "Holler Til You Pass Out" and "Chokechain" were later remixed for the band's major label debut. "Holler Til You Pass Out", "Chokechain", and "Dance with Me" are excluded from the iTunes release of the album.

Track listing

References

3OH!3 albums
2007 debut albums
Self-released albums